Ernst Christian Gottlieb Reinhold (18 October 1793 – 17 September 1855) was a German philosopher. He was the son of Karl Leonhard Reinhold and grandchild of Christoph Martin Wieland.

He at first lectured on philosophy at the University of Kiel, and afterwards was appointed professor of logic and metaphysics at the University of Jena. His philosophical system resembles Immanuel Kant's.

Works
 Versuch einer Begründung und neuen Darstellung der logischen Formen (1819).
 Grundzüge eines Systems der Erkenntnisslehre und Denklehre (1822).
 Die Logik oder die allgemeine Denkformenlehre (1827). Google (UMich)
 Beitrag zur Erläuterung der pythagoreischen Metaphysik (1827).
 Handbuch der allgemeinen Geschichte der Philosophie (1828–1830). 2 volumes (in 3).
 , 1828. Google (NYPL) Google (UCal) Google (UWisc)
 , 1829. Google (NYPL) Google (UCal)
 , 1830. Google (NYPL) Google (UCal)
 , 1845. 2 Volumes. Geschichte der Philosophie nach den Hauptmomenten ihrer Entwickelung.
 . Google (Oxford)
 . Google (Oxford)
 Theorie des menschlichen Erkenntnissvermögens und Metaphysik (1832–35). 2 volumes.
 , 1832.
 , 1835. Google (Harvard)
 Lehrbuch der philosophisch-propädeutischen Psychologie nebst den Grundlagen der formalen Logik (1835).
 , 1839. Lehrbuch der philosophisch-propädeutischen Psychologie und formale Logik.
 Lehrbuch der Geschichte der Philosophie (1836). , 1839. , 1849.
 Die Wissenschaften der praktischen Philosophie im Grundrisse (1837). 3 volumes. Google (Harvard)
 System der Metaphysik (1842). , 1854.
 Ueber das Wesen der Religion und seinen Ausdruck im evangelischen Christenthum (1846).

References

External links 
 Obituary in The Criterion (1856), vol. 1, no. 6, p. 91.
 Biography in Ludwig Noack's Philosophie-geschichtliches Lexikon (1879), pp. 737-38. 
 Sample of handwriting.

1793 births
1855 deaths
19th-century German philosophers
Age of Enlightenment
Enlightenment philosophers
Epistemologists
German logicians
German male non-fiction writers
Metaphysicians
Ontologists
People from Saxe-Weimar
Philosophers of education
Philosophers of history
Philosophers of logic
Philosophers of mind
Academic staff of the University of Jena